Disengage may refer to: 

"Disengage" (song), by Suicide Silence
Disengage (album), the third and final album by Circle of Dust
Disen Gage, a Russian rock band 
Disengage, a straight edge hardcore band with members of Title Fight and Bad Seed.
 "Disengage" (Star Trek: Picard), an episode of the third season of Star Trek: Picard

See also

Disengagement (disambiguation)
Engagement (disambiguation)
Engaged (disambiguation)
Engage (disambiguation)